The 20th annual Webby Awards for 2016 was held at Cipriani Wall Street in New York City on May 16, 2016, which was hosted by comedian and actor Nick Offerman. The awards ceremony was streamed live on the Webby Awards website. Judges from the International Academy of Digital Arts and Sciences picked the over one hundred winners, which may or may not match the people's choice.
The Webby for Lifetime Achievement was awarded to The Onion, having earned over 39 Webbys for its humor over the past 20 years.

Nominees and winners

(from http://webbyawards.com/winners/2016/)

References
Winners and nominees are generally named according to the organization or website winning the award, although the recipient is, technically, the web design firm or internal department that created the winning site and in the case of corporate websites, the designer's client.  Web links are provided for informational purposes, both in the most recently available archive.org version before the awards ceremony and, where available, the current website.  Many older websites no longer exist, are redirected, or have been substantially redesigned.

External links
Official site

2016
2016 awards in the United States
2016 in New York City
May 2016 events in the United States
2016 in Internet culture